Sports World Izunagaoka was a water park and resort that operated in Shizuoka, Japan. It opened in 1988, but closed in 1996 after its owners went bankrupt. The resort then sat abandoned for nearly 15 years until its demolition in early 2010, leaving only a few buildings and the parking lot.

See also
 List of water parks

References

Water parks in Japan
Defunct amusement parks in Japan
Resorts in Japan
1988 establishments in Japan
1996 disestablishments in Japan